Miss Chinese International Pageant 2004, the 16th Miss Chinese International Pageant, was held on January 17, 2004 in Hong Kong.  The pageant was organized and televised by TVB in Hong Kong.  At the end of the pageant, Miss Chinese International 2003 Rachel Tan of Kuala Lumpur, Malaysia crowned Linda Chung of Vancouver, British Columbia, Canada as the new winner.

Pageant information
The theme to the 2004 pageant was "China's Elegance of a Lifetime, The Blossoming of Chinese Like Hundreds of Flowers" 「中國盛世風采  華裔百花吐艷」.  The Masters of Ceremonies included Vinci Wong and the cast of Virtues of Harmony, including Louis Yuen, Kingdom Yuen, Michael Tse, Joyce Chen, Bondy Chiu, Johnny Tang.  Special performing guests were cantopop singers Andy Hui, Cecilia Cheung, and Jordan Chan.

Results

Special awards
Miss Friendship: Mandy Cho 曹敏莉 (Hong Kong)
Miss Radiant Smile: Carlene Aguilar 洪巧玲 (Manila)

Contestant list

Crossovers
Contestants who previously competed or will be competing at other international beauty pageants:

Miss World
 2005: : Carlene Aguilar (Top 15)
Miss Earth
 2001: : Carlene Aguilar (Top 10)

Contestant notes
Carlene Aguilar of Manila competed at a number of international pageants. She was a top 10 semifinalist at Miss Earth 2001. Aguilar went on to act for TVB, before traveling to Sanya, China to compete in the Miss World 2005 pageant. Aguilar finished as a top 15 semifinalist.

External links
 Miss Chinese International Pageant 2004 Official Site

TVB
2004 beauty pageants
2004 in Hong Kong
Beauty pageants in Hong Kong
Miss Chinese International Pageants